Events in the year 1185 in Portugal.

Incumbents
King: Alfonso I, Sancho I

Events
Coronation of Sancho I

Deaths
December 6 - Alfonso I

References

12th century in Portugal
Portugal
Portugal